A Howling in the Woods is a 1971 American made-for-television thriller film directed by Daniel Petrie and starring Barbara Eden, Larry Hagman, John Rubinstein, and Vera Miles. The teleplay was written by Richard DeRoy based on the 1968 novel by Velda Johnston. Its plot follows a housewife vacationing in the woods who experiences mysterious howling noises in the night. The film premiered on NBC as the NBC World Premiere Movie on November 5, 1971. It was released theatrically in Europe.

Produced by Universal Television, the film was shot on location in Lake Tahoe and nearby Dayton, Nevada. A Howling in the Woods also reunited Barbara Eden and Larry Hagman shortly after their TV series I Dream of Jeannie was cancelled.

Summary
Liza Crocker (Barbara Eden) is a disillusioned housewife with plans to divorce her husband Eddie (Larry Hagman). She returns to her family home in a small Nevada town to visit her step-mother (Vera Miles) and discovers she has a new step-brother (John Rubinstein), her father seemingly missing, mysterious behavior by the townsfolk and a mysterious howling in the woods at night.

Cast
Barbara Eden as Liza Crocker
Larry Hagman as Eddie Crocker
John Rubinstein as Justin Conway
Vera Miles as Rose Staines
Tyne Daly as Sally Bixton
Ruta Lee as Sharon
George Murdock as Mel Warren
Ford Rainey as Bud Henshaw
Lisa Gerritsen as Betsy Warren
Bill Vint as Lonnie Henshaw
Karl Swenson as Apperson

References
 Johnston, Velda, A Howling in the Woods 186 p. Dodd, Mead & Company, New York (1968)

External links

1971 television films
1971 films
1970s psychological thriller films
NBC network original films
American horror television films
Films based on thriller novels
Films based on American novels
Films set in Nevada
Films directed by Daniel Petrie
Films scored by Dave Grusin
1970s American films